Pullman School District #267 is a public school district in Whitman County, Washington, USA and serves the city of Pullman.

As of May 2011, the district has an enrollment of 2,430 students and as of October 2010, the district had an enrollment of 126 classroom teachers.

Race and Ethnicity

As of October 2010, there were 1,742 (71.7%) Whites, 231 (9.5%) Asians/Pacific Islanders, 226 (9.3%) Asians, 225 (9.3%) Hispanics, 154 (6.3%) people with two or more races, 62 (2.6%) Blacks, 14 (0.6%) American Indians/Alaskan Natives and 5 (0.2%) Pacific Islanders.

Schools

High schools
Pullman High School

Middle schools
Lincoln Middle School

Elementary schools
Franklin Elementary School
Jefferson Elementary School
Kamiak Elementary School
Sunnyside Elementary School

References

External links
 

School districts in Washington (state)
Education in Whitman County, Washington
Pullman, Washington